Edgar Machuca (born 29 April 1989) is a Paraguayan footballer currently playing for Juventud de Las Piedras in the Uruguayan Primera División.

On 19 May 2012, he made his debut for Plaza Colonia playing against Central Español in a 2–4 home loss.

References

External links 
 

1989 births
Living people
Paraguayan footballers
Association football defenders
Plaza Colonia players
Juventud de Las Piedras players
Expatriate footballers in Uruguay